Lisa Thomsen (born 20 August 1985) is a German volleyball player. She is a member of the Germany women's national volleyball team and played for Lokomotiv Baku in 2014. She was part of the German national team at the 2014 FIVB Volleyball Women's World Championship in Italy.

Clubs
  Bayer 04 Leverkusen (2003–2006)
  USC Münster (2006–2009)
  Schweriner SC (2009–2013)
  Azeryol Baku (2013–2014)
  Lokomotiv Baku (2014–2015)
  Allianz MTV Stuttgart (2015–2016)

References

External links 
 
 

1985 births
Living people
German women's volleyball players
Sportspeople from Aachen
European Games competitors for Germany
Volleyball players at the 2015 European Games
LGBT volleyball players